Maximilian "Max" Nagl (born 7 August 1987) is a German professional motocross racer. He has competed in the Motocross World Championships since 2003.

Nagl was born in Weilheim, Germany. He Had his most successful season riding for Kimi Räikkönen's Ice 1 Racing Husqvarna factory racing team where he took multiple GP wins. Max looked promising for the title that year but was plagued with small injuries that set him back. The ice one racing team was managed by FIM racer Antti Pyrhönen. In the 2009 FIM Motocross World Championship season, he finished second to Antonio Cairoli in the MX1-GP series. 

Nagl was a member of the winning German team at the 2012 Motocross des Nations event that included Ken Roczen and Marcus Schiffer. Their victory marked the first German win in the history of the Motocross des Nations.

Season results 
 2000:  1. Place German Championship 85 cm³
 2001:  1. Place ADAC-Junior-Cup 85 cm³
 2002:  1. Place DMSB-Cup, 5. Place German Championship 125 cm³
 2003:  3. Place ADAC MX Masters, 35. Place World Championship 125 cm³
 2004:  1. Place ADAC MX Masters, 28. Place World Championship MX2
 2005:  3. Place ADAC MX Masters, 16. Place World Championship MX2
 2006:  1. Place ADAC MX Masters, 20. Place World Championship MX2
 2007:  3. Place ADAC MX Masters, 18. Place World Championship MX1
 2008:  1. Place ADAC MX Masters, 6. Place World Championship MX1 (KTM)
 2009:  4. Place ADAC MX Masters, 2. Place World Championship MX1 (KTM)
 2010:  7. Place ADAC MX Masters, 4. Place World Championship MX1(KTM)
 2011:  5. Place World Championship MX1 (KTM)
 2012:  5. Place ADAC MX Masters, 16. Place World Championship MX1, 1.Place Motocross des Nations with Ken Roczen and Marcus Schiffer (KTM)
 2013:  3. Place ADAC MX Masters, 10. Place World Championship MX1 (Honda)
 2014:  10. Place ADAC MX Masters,6. Place  World Championship MXGP (Honda)

References

External links
  
 Ice 1 Racing Website

1987 births
Living people
People from Weilheim-Schongau
Sportspeople from Upper Bavaria
German motocross riders